Digital terrestrial television in Estonia, was officially launched on 15 December 2006, when the operator Zuum TV launched its pay service on two multiplexes. Transmissions are made with MPEG-4 AVC compression using the DVB-T standard. A DVB-T2 standard-based network (Multiplex 7) has been created for HD-quality TV picture transmission.

In June 2007, Levira and ETV announced that they had agreed to launch an HDTV trial in July 2007.

In November 2007, a third multiplex was launched, covering almost all of the country. This multiplex was to be used by free-to-air services, while the two existing national multiplexes would only carry pay channels. Hence the public channel ETV was transferred to the new multiplex. At this time there are only five free-to-air channels (ETV, ETV2, ETV+, TallinnaTV, France 24) while others are pay-TV channels, offered by AS Elisa.

As of January 2019, There are 3 High Definition and 39 Standard Definition channels on these multiplexes:

See also
 Digital television transition

References

Television in Estonia
Estonia